Coretta Scott King (Class of 1951) gifted her name to Antioch College to create the Coretta Scott King Center in 2005. Fitting with the college's longstanding strength in experiential learning, the agreement stated that the center would be used as an experiential teaching center on issues of race, class, gender, diversity, and social justice for the campus and the surrounding community. The current Director of the Center is Mila Cooper.

The Center hosts a variety of programming such as civil rights trips, Kingian nonviolence workshops, gun control forum, and social justice symposiums. It also holds annual events including the Martin Luther King Lecture, the Coretta Scott King Legacy Luncheon.

The Coretta Scott King Center gives annual awards to recognize those who act for justice nationally, locally, and on campus. The highest award—the Coretta Scott King Legacy Award—has been presented to Congresswoman Eleanor Holmes Norton (an Antioch College alumna from the Class of 1960), Tamika Mallory, Bernard Lafayette, and Opal Tometi.

References

External links
 Coretta Scott King Center

Coretta Scott King
Antioch College